Charta 77 (named after Charter 77) is a Swedish punk band formed in 1983 in the Swedish town Köping. The band consists today of Per Granberg (vocals, guitar), Teijo Granberg (drums), Erik Ullvin (keyboard), Janne Olsson (guitar), Stefan ¨Mongo" Enger (bass). The band is a very popular live act, and often plays on music festivals.

Per Granberg met Johnny Smedberg after Per's former band N.O.S's gig, at Folkets Park in Köping, and they then formed the new band Charta 77.

Discography 
 Välfärdens Avfall, LP (1984)
 Sista Dansen, LP (1985)
 Out it's still dark, EP (1986)
 Split (PiP), LP (1987)
 White Face, 10" (1988)
 Explode, 7" (1989)
 Institution, justice & poverty, LP (1989)
 It vibrates, 7" (1990)
 Another brick in the wall, 12" (1990)
 The beauty is in the beholders eyes, CD/LP (1991)
 Kröp, gick & Skrek 83–85, 2LP (1991)
 Vykort från Rio, 7" (1991)
 Information, 7" (1992)
 Hobbydiktatorn, CD/LP (1992)
 Skrek ännu högre 85–87, CD (1993)
 Före Grisfesten, CDm (1993)
 Grisfesten, CD (1993)
 BLY, CD (1994)
 HEL !, CD (1994)
 6, CDs (1994)
 Världssamvetet, CDs (1995)
 Tecken i tiden, CD (1995)
 Herrarna i Sandlådan, CDs (1995)
 Lilla Björn och lilla Tiger, CDm (1995)
 Annorlunda, CD (1996)
 Before the rain, CDm (1997)
 Svart på vitt, CD (1998)
 83–98, CD box (1998)
 Singlar 85–98, 2CD (1998)
 När köttet är slut, CDm (1998)
 Jag är gud, CDs (1999)
 Sagan om världens mest hypade band, CD (2000)
 G8, CD (2002)
 Spegelapan (2004)
 ...stolt att vara svensk?, 7" (2013)
 Läs mellan raderna, Album (2013)
 Salt (2015)
 Trodde vi skulle ändra världen (2016)
 Svett - live in trondheim (2016)
 Inget varar för evigt så har det alltid varit, Album (2017)

References

External links 

 https://www.facebook.com/?ref=tn_tnmn#!/pages/Charta-77/147254062010318, the group's Official Facebook page
 https://www.facebook.com/?ref=tn_tnmn#!/groups/5625359339/, the group's Official Facebook group

Swedish punk rock groups
Musical groups established in 1983
1983 establishments in Sweden